Albert Lecoy de La Marche (21 November 1839, Nemours – 22 February 1897, Paris) was a French archivist and historian.

Graduated from the École des Chartes in 1861, he was appointed archivist of the Department of Haute Savoie. In 1864 he went to Paris as archivist in the historical section of the Archives de l'Empire; he was also, for many years, professor of French history at the Catholic Institute in Paris.  His magnum opus is Chaire française au moyen âge (Paris, 1868), which was awarded a prize by the Académie des Inscriptions et Belles-Lettres. It consists of three parts: Les prédicateurs; les sermons; la société d'après les sermons. Part I begins with a summary of the history of preaching in the early Church, and in France prior to the eleventh century, and then gives an exhaustive history of French preachers in the following centuries, especially the thirteenth. Part II deals with the audiences, the time and the place of preaching, and the various kinds of sermons. Part III is a study of all social classes of French society in the Middle Ages as it appears in the light of the sermons.

Other publications
Le roi René, sa vie, son administration (1873); 
L'Académie de France à Rome (1874); 
Anecdotes historiques, légendes et apologues, tirés du recueil inédit d'Étienne de Bourbon dominicain du 13e siècle (1877); 
La Société au XIIIe siècle (1880); 
Saint Martin (1881); 
Les manuscrits et la miniature (1884); 
Relations politiques de la France et du royaume de Majorque (1892), etc.

References

Attribution
 cites:
Revue des questions historiques (Paris, 1897).

1839 births
1897 deaths
19th-century French historians
French archivists
École Nationale des Chartes alumni
19th-century French male writers
French male non-fiction writers